Colin Shutler (born August 2, 1998) is an American soccer player who currently plays for Orange County SC in the USL Championship.

Playing career

Youth, college and amateur
Shutler was part of Loudoun FC’s 98B Red side, before playing college soccer at the University of Virginia in 2016. Shutler redshirted the 2016 season, before going on to make 45 appearances for the Cavaliers, registering 24 shutouts, a 0.68 Goals Against Average rating as well as an 81% save percentage. Shutler also became the first Cavalier goalkeeper to earn All-ACC First Team honors since Tony Meola did in 1989.

Whilst at college, Shutler also played with NPSL side Northern Virginia United in 2018 and 2019.

Professional
On January 21, 2021, Shutler was selected 48th overall in the 2021 MLS SuperDraft by FC Dallas. He went on to sign with Dallas' USL League One affiliate side North Texas SC on March 29, 2021.

Shutler made his professional debut on April 24, 2021, starting in a 4–2 win over Fort Lauderdale CF.

On March 9, 2022, Shutler moved to USL Championship side Orange County SC.

References 

1998 births
All-American men's college soccer players
American soccer players
Association football goalkeepers
FC Dallas draft picks
Living people
National Premier Soccer League players
North Texas SC players
Orange County SC players
Soccer players from Virginia
USL League One players
Virginia Cavaliers men's soccer players